Reverend Ralph Davenant founded Davenant Foundation School in  February 1680, when he left £100 in his will to start up a school for 40  poor boys of Whitechapel, London.

1492-1680 and before he died he was half way through making Davenant foundation grammar school.

Ralph Davenant was Rector of St Mary's in Whitechapel in the East End of London.

See also
Davenant Foundation School
Davenant International
Davenant Centre

External links
Official School website
Davenant International website

Founders of English schools and colleges
Year of birth missing
Year of death missing